The FIL World Luge Championships 1969 took place in Königssee, West Germany. It marked the first time the event took place on a permanent, artificially refrigerated track in bobsleigh, luge, and/ or skeleton.

Men's singles

Women's singles

Men's doubles

Medal table

References
Men's doubles World Champions
Men's singles World Champions
Women's singles World Champions

FIL World Luge Championships
1969 in luge
1996 in German sport
Luge in Germany